Meera (or Mirabai) was a Hindu mystic poet and devotee of Krishna.

Meera may also refer to:
 Meera (Malayalam actress), Indian actress
 Meera (actress) (born 1977), Pakistani film actress
 Meera (1945 film), a Tamil-language film starring M. S. Subbulakshmi
 Meera (1979 film), a Hindi film by Gulzar
 Meera (1992 film), a Tamil-language film starring Vikram
 Meera (2009 TV series), a 2009–2010 Indian Hindi-language historical drama television series
 Meera (2010 TV series), a 2010 Indian Tamil-language soap opera
 Mother Meera (born 1960), Indian religious leader

People
 Meera Jasmine (born 1982), south Indian actor
 Meera Krishnan, Tamil actor
 Meera Pakam, a character in the Netflix series  Grand Army
 Meera Syal (born 1961), British-Indian actress
 Meera Reed, character from George R. R. Martin's A Song of Ice and Fire novels

See also
 Mera (disambiguation)
 Mira (disambiguation)
 Mirra Alfassa (also: The Mother, 1878–1973), spiritual collaborator of Sri Aurobindo